Dark Angel is the second studio album by South Korean singer Lee Hyori. It was released on February 11, 2006. The album features singles "Get Ya!", "Shall We Dance?", and "Straight Up". It is notable for the plagiarism controversy regarding her first single, "Get Ya!", which was accused of copying Britney Spears's single "Do Somethin'" (2005).

Plagiarism accusations 
The first single from her album, "Get Ya!" was accused of plagiarizing Britney Spears's "Do Somethin'," as proposed by the composer of the American pop star's hit. After the news started to spread, Lee and her record company announced that promotion of the single would be quickly halted, and that she would have a short break from activities in order to promote her follow-up single "Shall We Dance?". This was the last single of the album to be promoted by Lee, although "Straight Up" was released as the last single from the album.

Critical reception 

Lee Dae-hwa of music webzine IZM gave the album a negative review. Coupled with its plagiarism allegations, Lee criticized the album's composition and cohesiveness.

Accolades

Track listing

Sales

References

2006 albums
Lee Hyori albums
Albums involved in plagiarism controversies